The Irving Langmuir Prize in Chemical Physics is awarded annually, in even years by the American Chemical Society and in odd years by the American Physical Society. The award is meant to recognize and encourage outstanding interdisciplinary research in chemistry and physics, in the spirit of Irving Langmuir. A nominee must have made an outstanding contribution to chemical physics or physical chemistry within the 10 years preceding the year in which the award is made. The award will be granted without restriction, except that the recipient must be a resident of the United States.

The award was established in 1931 by Dr. A.C. Langmuir, brother of Nobel Prize-winning chemist Irving Langmuir, to recognize the best young chemist in the United States. A $10,000 prize was to be awarded annually by the American Chemical Society. The first recipient was Linus Pauling. In 1964, the General Electric Foundation took over the financial backing of the prize, which was renamed the Irving Langmuir Award and the modern selection process was created. In 2006 the GE Global Research took over sponsorship of the award, and since 2009 the award has been co-sponsored between GE Global Research and the ACS Division of Physical Chemistry.

Past recipients
Source: American Physical Society and American Chemical Society

See also

 List of physics awards
 List of chemistry awards

References

External links 
 Irving Langmuir Page at the American Chemical Society Site
 Irving Langmuir Page at the American Physical Society Site

Awards of the American Chemical Society
Awards of the American Physical Society
Physical chemistry
Awards established in 1931